The scepter of Charles V, also known in the early modern period as scepter of Charlemagne, is one of the most prominent preserved regalia of the Kingdom of France. It was donated by Charles V to the abbey of Saint-Denis on 7 May 1380, shortly before his death. It has been used since for the coronation (sacre) of nearly all monarchs of France until Charles X, only excepting Charles VII and Henri IV. It has been kept at the Louvre since 5 December 1793.

Description

The scepter consists of four elements: a shaft, a bulb, a fleur-de-lis, and a seated figure of Charlemagne on top. The bulb is decorated with three scenes from the Historia Caroli Magni. Charlemagne is represented holding a scepter and globus cruciger. 

An inscription at the base of Charlemagne's seat reads "SANTUS [sic] KAROLUS MAGNUS ITALIA ROMA GALIA ET [?] ALIA". A reading of "...ET GERMANIA" was proposed in the 16th century but is incompatible with the preserved object.

History

The scepter was probably created in the 1370s. It has been attributed to court goldsmith Hennequin du Vivier. It may be viewed as bolstering the legitimacy of Charles V and his family in the context of the Hundred Years' War, by emphasizing their Carolingian lineage. It was repaired on multiple occasions, including in 1722, 1775, 1804 and 1825. The crown is not original and was replaced at some date before 1624. The scepter held by Charlemagne and one of the eagles on his seat are also replacements. 

In 1804, the scepter's shaft was restored using what was until then a separate precious object, known as the staff of Guillaume de Roquémont, originally created in 1394. That modification was made ahead of the coronation of Napoleon I during which the scepter was used together with other French regalia. The fleur-de-lis was enameled in white in the past, as appears in depictions such as the Madonna of the Vic family by Frans Pourbus the Younger.

Gallery

See also
 Iconography of Charlemagne
 Treasury of Saint-Denis

Notes

French Crown Jewels
Cultural depictions of Charlemagne